The Fisher Super Koala is a two-seat, high wing, conventional landing gear, single-engined, light kit aircraft designed for construction by amateur builders. The aircraft was inspired by the design of the Piper J-3 Cub and strongly resembles that design.

Fisher Flying Products was originally based in Edgeley, North Dakota, United States but the company is now located in Dorchester, Ontario, Canada.

Development
The Super Koala was designed by Fisher Aircraft in the United States and was first flown in 1983. It has two seats in side-by-side configuration. With its  empty weight and  maximum gross weight, the Super Koala was intended for the US homebuilt aircraft category.

The construction of the Super Koala is unusual for aircraft in its class. The aircraft's structure is entirely made from wood, with the wooden fuselage built from wood strips arranged in a geodesic form, resulting in a very strong and light aircraft with redundant load paths. Like the Cub, both the wings and fuselage on the Super Koala are covered with doped aircraft fabric. The wings are strut-braced and utilize jury struts. The landing gear is bungee suspended and the tail wheel is steerable. The Super Koala has flaps, with brakes optional. The company claims it takes an average amateur builder 500 hours to construct a Super Koala.

Engine options are the  Rotax 503 and the  Rotax 582 engine.

Specifications (Super Koala)

See also
Fisher FP-202 Koala

References

External links

Photo of Super Koala

1980s Canadian ultralight aircraft
Aircraft first flown in 1982